ONS 18 and ON 202 were North Atlantic convoys of the ONS/ON series which ran during the battle of the Atlantic in World War II. They were the subject of a major U-boat attack in September 1943, the first battle in the Kriegsmarines autumn offensive, following the withdrawal from the North Atlantic route after Black May.

Background

Following the defeats of May 1943, and the devastating losses incurred by the U-boat Arm (U-Bootwaffe, or UBW) Admiral Dönitz had withdrawn from attacks on the North Atlantic route while awaiting tactical and technical improvements. Chief among these was the T-5 acoustic torpedo, with which (it was planned) the convoy escorts could be attacked and eliminated, leaving the merchant ships defenceless. By September 1943 these were ready, and U-boat Control (Befehlshaber der Unterseeboote, BdU) dispatched
a patrol group of 21 boats, code-named Leuthen, to renew the attack on the North Atlantic route.

Ships involved
In September 1943 BdU had established  the patrol line Leuthen of 21 U-boats south of Greenland; these were to intercept west-bound convoys as they were about to enter the Greenland Air Gap, where Allied aircraft were reckoned to be unable to operate due to the extreme range.

On 12 September 1943  convoy ONS 18 left Liverpool bound for Halifax.
Composed of 27 ships it was protected by B-3  Escort Group, comprising  2 destroyers, Escapade and Keppel, the frigate Towy ( Cdr MB Evans RN, the Senior Officer:Escort), and 5 corvettes; Narcissus, Orchis, Roselys, Lobelia and Renoncule.
ONS 18 was also accompanied by the MAC carrier Empire MacAlpine.

When Western Approaches Command became aware of Leuthen, it was decided to reinforce ONS 18; the following convoy, ON 202 was ordered to close up, and a support group, SG 9, sent to join.

ON 202 had left Liverpool on 15 September, composed of 38 ships and escorted by
Canadian escort group C-2, comprising 2 destroyers, Gatineau (commanded by Lt.Cdr PW Burnett RN, SOE) and Icarus; the frigate Lagan, and 3 corvettes; Drumheller, Kamloops and Polyanthus.

Support Group 9 comprised destroyer St Croix, frigate Itchen (Cdr CE Bridgman RN, SOE) and 3 corvettes, Chambly, Morden and Sackville.

Altogether the 65 ships were escorted by 19 warships, to face an attack from 21 U-boats.

Action

On 19 September ONS 18 was sighted by U-270; after sending a sighting report she was authorized to attack.
Closing in U-270 fired a T-5 acoustic torpedo at Lagan, damaging her stern, the first case of an Allied warship to be damaged by the new weapon.
The escorts counter-attacked, but U-270 escaped, though Escapade was damaged by a misfire from her Hedgehog. Both Lagan and Escapade were forced to detach, returning to base under escort.

The Leuthen boats closed in during 19 September, but 2 were attacked by air patrols, which, since the introduction of a number of Very Long Range (VLR) Liberators during the summer, had been extended into the Air Gap.
U-341 was attacked and sunk by a Liberator from 10 Squadron RCAF.
U-338 was attacked by a Liberator of 120 Sqdn RAF which was credited with the kill; however post-war analysis showed that U-338 was only damaged by this, though was later engaged and sunk by the corvette Drumheller of C 2 group.

On the night of 19/20 several Leuthen boats were in contact;
U-260 attacked, but gained no hits.
U-238 fired on 2 ships, sinking one, Theodore Dwight Weld, and damaging another, Frederick Douglass. She fell out of the convoy, and was sunk later in the day by U-645.

On 20/21 a dozen boats were in contact, and 8 were able to attack.
U-305 hit St Croix, which sank with the loss of 66 of her crew.
U-952 hit Polyanthus, which exploded and sank, leaving 1 survivor.
He, and 81 men from St Croix, were picked up by Itchen.
U-386 was damaged by depth-charge attack and was forced to retire; U-603 was ordered to rendezvous, but was thwarted by air attacks.

Leuthen remained in contact, and on the night of 21/22 renewed the attack.
U-377 attacked, claiming hits, but these were not confirmed; she was attacked and damaged by aircraft and retired.
U-230 attacked, but again no hits were confirmed, she also was attacked by an unidentified escort and forced to retire.
U-229 was attacked and destroyed, this being credited to Keppel, Evans' flagship.
U-422 was damaged by air attack, but was able to continue.

On 23 September the convoys reached the Grand Banks area, where fog hindered visibility both of the air patrols and the attacking Leuthen boats.
U-238 was able to penetrate the escort screen and sank 3 ships;
Skjelbred, Oregon Express, and Fort Jemseg.
U-666 torpedoed Itchen; she sank, leaving just 3 survivors from her own crew and those of Polyanthus and St Croix she was carrying.
U-952 sank Steel Voyager  and damaged James Gordon Bennett.
U-758 attacked, but had no hits confirmed and was herself damaged by a depth-charge attack.

Poor visibility, fuel shortages, and fatigue now beset both U-boats and escorts, but BdU, believing the attack to have been a great success, ordered Leuthen to break off the attack.

Claims by the various boat amounted to 12 escorts and 9 ships sunk, and a further 2 ships damaged

Actual losses were 3 escorts and 6 ships, with another damaged, while 3 U-boats were destroyed with a further 3 damaged and forced to return to base.

Both convoys continued to their destinations, ONS 18 reaching Halifax on 29 September, while ON 202 arrived at New York on 1 October.

Conclusion

Believing the new tactics and weapons to be a great success, BdU continued the offensive. Leuthen was disbanded, with 12 boats forming a new patrol line, Rossbach, joined by 9 boats from home bases to attack the next set of east-bound convoys.

The Admiralty were also encouraged by the result. Despite the losses, (which were serious), 90% of the ships had arrived safely. The losses, while serious, were no more grievous than during the battles of late 1942 and early 1943. Thus they were confident the escorts would be able to meet the challenge of the U-boat Arm's new weapons and tactics.

Tables

Allied ships lost

. b) Allied warships lost

. c) Axis submarines lost

See also
 List of shipwrecks in September 1943

Notes

References
 Clay Blair : Hitler's U-Boat War [Volume 2]: The Hunted 1942–1945 (1998)  (2000 UK paperback ed.)
 Bernard Edwards :Donitz and the Wolf Packs (1996) 
 Arnold Hague : The Allied Convoy System 1939–1945 (2000) ISBN (Canada) 1 55125 033 0 :   ISBN (UK) 1 86176 147 3
 Paul Kemp  : U-Boats Destroyed  ( 1997) . 
 Axel Neistle  : German U-Boat Losses during World War II  (1998) .  
 Stephen Roskill : The War at Sea 1939–1945   Vol III (1960)    ISBN (none)
 Jak P M Showell U-Boat Warfare: The Evolution of the Wolf-Pack  (2002) 
 HMS Itchen at uboat.net

External links
 ONS 18 on convoyweb
 ON 202 on convoyweb
 ONS 18/ON 202 on warsailors

ONS18
Naval battles of World War II involving Canada
C